R515 road may refer to:
 R515 road (Ireland)
 R515 (South Africa)